Asaf Ataseven  (1932–2003) was a Turkish doctor who served as chief physician at Gureba Hospital in Istanbul.

See also
List of Turkish physicians

References
Death notice on Samanyoluhaber.com 

20th-century Turkish physicians
1932 births
2003 deaths
Deaths from cancer in Turkey
Deaths from leukemia